Suonan is a town, and the county seat of, Dongxiang Autonomous County, Linxia Hui Autonomous Prefecture, Gansu, China.

It was named after Tibetan Empire consul Sunanpu, who lived here. Since 1950, it has been the seat of the county government.

The economy is mainly involved around agriculture, producing wheat, potatoes and beans. The town also has factories for agricultural machinery and carpets.

References 

Dongxiang Autonomous County
Township-level divisions of Gansu